Bárbara Klarissa Olivieri Dávila (born 24 February 2002) is a footballer who plays as an attacking midfielder and a forward for NWSL club Houston Dash. Born in the United States, she represents the Venezuela women's national team.

Early life and education
Olivieri was born and raised in Katy, Texas, United States to Venezuelan parents. She attended Tompkins High School.

College career
Olivieri has attended the Texas A&M University in College Station, Texas.

Club career
Olivieri signed with Monterrey in Mexico in early February 2022.

International career
Olivieri represented Venezuela at the  2018 South American Under-17 Women's Football Championship and the 2020 & 2022 South American Under-20 Women's Football Championship. At senior level, she made her debut on 1 December 2021, in a 2–1 friendly win over India.

References

External links
 
 
 
 

2002 births
Living people
People with acquired Venezuelan citizenship
Venezuelan women's footballers
Women's association football midfielders
Women's association football forwards
C.F. Monterrey (women) players
Venezuela women's international footballers
Venezuelan expatriate women's footballers
Venezuelan expatriate sportspeople in Mexico
Expatriate women's footballers in Mexico
People from Katy, Texas
Soccer players from Texas
American women's soccer players
Texas A&M Aggies women's soccer players
American expatriate women's soccer players
American expatriate sportspeople in Mexico
American sportspeople of Venezuelan descent